Keda is a monotypic genus of hoverfly from the family Syrphidae, in the order Diptera.

References

Hoverfly genera
Monotypic Brachycera genera
Diptera of Asia
Diptera of Australasia
Eristalinae
Taxa named by Charles Howard Curran